Black Lotus Records was an independent record label based in Greece that specialized in metal. After licensing a number of new artists, Black Lotus Records declared bankruptcy and all announced titles are on hold indefinitely.

See also 
 List of record labels

References

External links

Greek independent record labels
Heavy metal record labels